The Telus Tower is an office building at 630 René Lévesque Boulevard West in Montreal. It was built for Canadian Industries Limited from 1960 to 1962, given the name CIL House. Designed by architect Gordon Bunshaft from the architectural firm Skidmore, Owings and Merrill with local architects Greenspoon, Freedlander and Dunne, it stands 135.6 m (445 ft) and 34 storeys tall. In 1960, Bunshaft had recently completed his seminal work, Lever House in New York City.

During the 1960s when Montreal's financial district shifted from its St. James Street center to midtown, The CIL House also became the annex headquarters of the Bank of Montreal when it added a main banking branch there.  Then-named Dorchester Boulevard West became the financial center of Montreal and Canada with the largest Canadian banks and insurance companies having a presence.  In later years, CIL moved its head office operations to Ontario. The Royal Trust later received naming rights to the building when it located its head office there until the merger with the Royal Bank of Canada. The name Royal Trust Tower now refers to another building in Toronto.

Today, it is home to the Montreal operations of Telus, the head office of Telus Health Solutions, but also houses the local offices of NEUF architect(e)s, Accenture, Roche, Canada Life, Clyde & Co, Fairstone Financial, Inc., as well as a Bank of Montreal , branch.

See also
List of Montreal's 10 tallest skyscrapers
Architects' Building, which also bore the name CIL House from about 1936 to 1954

References

External links
 
 Redbourne (real-estate manager of the building)
630 René-Lévesque Boulevard West - Technical Specifications

Office buildings completed in 1962
Skyscrapers in Montreal
Skidmore, Owings & Merrill buildings
Skyscraper office buildings in Canada
International style architecture in Canada
Downtown Montreal
Telus